Eggelsberg is a municipality in the district Braunau am Inn in Austrian state of Upper Austria.

Geography
Eggelsberg lies in the Innviertel. About 20 percent of the municipality is forest and 69 percent farmland. The Ibmer Moor is the largest moor in Austria.

Eggelsberg includes the Katastralgemeinden (subdivisions) Gundertshausen, Heimhausen, Haselreith, and Ibm (pictured).

Settlements
In brackets:Inhabitants as 1 January 2020

Arnstetten (40)
Autmannsdorf (62)
Beckenberg (44)
Bergstetten (78)
Eggelsberg (876)
Großschäding (31)
Gundertshausen (218)
Haselreith (39)
Hehenberg (19)
Heimhausen (93)
Hitzging (14)
Hötzenau (2)
Ibm(331)
Kleinschäding (48)
Meindlsberg (5)
Miesling (12)
Oberhaslach (10)
Oberhaunsberg (20)
Pippmannsberg (53)
Revier Eggelsberg (72)
Revier Gundertshausen (114)
Revier Heimhausen (57)
Trametshausen (64)
Untergrub (6)
Unterhaunsberg (39)
Wannersdorf (73)
Weilbuch (13)
Weinberg (16)

References

Cities and towns in Braunau am Inn District